The 2009 World Junior Ice Hockey Championships (2009 WJHC), was the 33rd edition of the Ice Hockey World Junior Championship and was played in Ottawa, Ontario, Canada, between December 26, 2008 and January 5, 2009. Games were held at the Ottawa Civic Centre and Scotiabank Place. The tournament set a record for WJC attendance at 453,282. Canada won the gold medal for a record-tying fifth consecutive time. No country would win back-to-back gold until the 2023 World Junior Ice Hockey Championships when Canada won the 2022 and 2023 tournaments respectively.

Bid process
Five potential bid groups formally submitted their bids before the March 31, 2006, deadline and made their final presentations to the selection committee in Calgary on April 18, 2006:
Joint bid from Calgary and Edmonton, Alberta;
Montreal, Quebec;
Ottawa, Ontario;
Toronto, Ontario; and
Saskatoon and Regina, Saskatchewan

On May 3, 2006, Hockey Canada and the Canadian Hockey League announced that Ottawa was chosen to host the 2009 tournament.

Venues

Top Division

Preliminary round

Group A 

Schedule
All times local (EST/UTC−5)

Group B 

Schedule
All times local (EST/UTC−5)

Relegation round 
The results from matches between teams from the same group in the preliminary round are carried forward to this round.

Results
All times local (EST/UTC−5)

Final round

Quarterfinals

Semifinals

5th place playoff

3rd place playoff

Final

Top 10 scorers

Goaltending leaders 
(minimum 40% team's total ice time)

TOI = Time on ice (minutes:seconds); SA = Shots against; GA = Goals against; GAA = Goals against average; Sv% = Save percentage; SO = Shutouts
Source:
09:50, 6 January 2009 (UTC)

Tournament awards
Source:

Most Valuable Player
 John Tavares

All-star team

Goaltender: Jaroslav Janus
Defencemen: P. K. Subban,  Erik Karlsson
Forwards: John Tavares,  Cody Hodgson,  Nikita Filatov

IIHF best player awards

Goaltender: Jacob Markström
Defenceman: Erik Karlsson
Forward: John Tavares

Final standings

Division I 

The Division I Championships were played between December 14 and December 20, 2008 in Herisau, Switzerland (Group A), and between December 15 and December 21, 2008 in Aalborg, Denmark (Group B).

Group A

Group B

Division II 

The Division II Championships were played between December 15 and December 21, 2008 in Miercurea-Ciuc, Romania (Group A), and between January 10 and January 15, 2009 in Logroño, Spain (Group B).

Group A

Group B 
, having been relegated to Division III in 2008, was returned to Division II after  forfeited due to finances.

Division III 
The Division III tournament was to have been played in North Korea, but was cancelled. The Division III was scheduled to include the following:

References

External links
 IIHF official website

 
Junior World Ice Hockey Championships
Ice hockey competitions in Ottawa
2009
International ice hockey competitions hosted by Canada
World
World Junior Ice Hockey Championships
World Junior Ice Hockey Championships
World Junior Ice Hockey Championships, 2009
World Junior Ice Hockey Championships
World Junior Ice Hockey Championships